El Buen Tono was a Mexican manufacturer of cigarettes founded by Ernesto Pugibet, a French entrepreneur who migrated to Mexico in 1879. The company was founded in 1894 and ceased to exist around 1961.

References

External links 
 

Tobacco companies of Mexico
Chemical companies established in 1894
Manufacturing companies established in 1894
Year of disestablishment missing
Mexican companies established in 1894